Joseph R. Ouellette (May 9, 1930 – September 3, 1950) was a soldier in the United States Army during the Korean War. He posthumously received the Medal of Honor for his actions on August 31, and September 1–3, 1950.

Medal of Honor citation
Rank and organization: Private First Class, U.S. Army, Company H, 9th Infantry Regiment, 2nd Infantry Division

Place and date: Near Yongsan, Korea, from August 31, to September 3, 1950. 

Entered service at: Lowell, Mass. Birth: Lowell, Mass. 

G.O. No.: 25, April 25, 1951. 

Citation:

Pfc. Ouellette distinguished himself by conspicuous gallantry and intrepidity in action against the enemy in the Makioug-Chang River salient. When an enemy assault cut off and surrounded his unit he voluntarily made a reconnaissance of a nearby hill under intense enemy fire to locate friendly troop positions and obtain information of the enemy's strength and location. Finding that friendly troops were not on the hill, he worked his way back to his unit under heavy fire. Later, when an airdrop of water was made outside the perimeter, he again braved enemy fire in an attempt to retrieve water for his unit. Finding the dropped cans broken and devoid of water, he returned to his unit. His heroic attempt greatly increased his comrades' morale. When ammunition and grenades ran low, Pfc. Ouellette again slipped out of the perimeter to collect these from the enemy dead. After collecting grenades he was attacked by an enemy soldier. He killed this enemy in hand-to-hand combat, gathered up the ammunition, and returned to his unit. When the enemy attacked on 3 September, they assaulted his position with grenades. On 6 occasions Pfc. Ouellette leaped from his foxhole to escape exploding grenades. In doing so, he had to face enemy small-arms fire. He continued his resistance, despite a severe wound, until he lost his life. The extraordinary heroism and intrepidity displayed by Pfc. Ouellette reflect the highest credit on himself and are in keeping with the esteemed traditions of the military service.

Legacy

The US Army named an outpost, Observation Post Ouellette after him, in the Korean DMZ, near to the Joint Security Area.

PFC Ouellette also has a bridge named after him in his hometown of Lowell, Massachusetts.

See also

List of Medal of Honor recipients
List of Korean War Medal of Honor recipients

Notes

References

External links

1930 births
1950 deaths
People from Lowell, Massachusetts
American people of French-Canadian descent
United States Army Medal of Honor recipients
American military personnel killed in the Korean War
Korean War recipients of the Medal of Honor
United States Army soldiers
United States Army personnel of the Korean War